Baia de Fier is a commune in Gorj County, Oltenia, Romania. It is composed of two villages, Baia de Fier and Cernădia. It is traversed by the river Pârâul Galben; to the east flows the river Olteț. Peștera Muierilor (women's cave) is located here.

Baia de Fier is a sister city to Boccioleto, Italy since 2007.

References

Communes in Gorj County
Localities in Oltenia